Baje Wala (sometimes spelled as Bajewala) is a village in the Sardulgarh tehsil of Mansa district in Punjab, India. Chhapian Wali, Raman Nandi, Bire Wala Jattan and Raipur are the surrounding villages.

References 

Villages in Mansa district, India